Spyro Paliouras, or Spiro Paliouras (Greek: Σπύρος Παλιούρας, 1875–1957), a Greek writer, moved to Athens, Greece, at a young age. He started earning his living in Athens. After leaving Athens, he lived in Paris, France, and later moved to Marseille. In Marseille, he worked at a specialized machine factory. It was during this time, he began his career as a writer. His personal writings were researched by many, including Dimitris Pikionis, Michael Tombros, Nikos Hadjikyriakos-Ghikas, and Fotis Kontoglou. In 1939, Paliouras migrated to Piraeus, Greece and lived there until his death in 1957.

His exhibition on works returned to the Piraeus Municipal Theatre in 1962 with organists from Plato Lyceum and Team Plato.  His works are distinguishable for his protagonism, spontaneity, his thinking, simplicity and popularity.

References
''The first version of the article is translated from and is based on the article at the Greek Wikipedia (el:Main Page)

1870s births
1933 deaths
Evrytania
Greek emigrants to France
French male writers
People from Karpenisi
20th-century French male writers
19th-century Greek painters
20th-century Greek painters